Basketball was one of the 21 sports disciplines held in the 1982 Asian Games in New Delhi, India. South Korea defeated China in the championship rematch and won their 2nd Asian Games title. The games were held from 20 November – 3 December 1982.

Medalists

Medal table

Results

Men

Preliminary round

Group A

Group B

Group C

Group D

Final round

Classification 9th–13th

Championship

Final classification

Women

Round robin

Final standing

References 
 Men's Results
 Women's Results

 
Basketball
1982
1982 in Asian basketball
International basketball competitions hosted by India